Kurnwill is a locality situated on the Tarrango-Tunart Road in the Sunraysia region. The place by road, is situated about 15 kilometres eas from Tunart and 6 kilometres west from Bambill South.Kurnwill had a school operating in the 20s and thirties. The original building can be found at the Meringur Pioneer Village in full working order.

References